The Authorized Bang Collection is a compilation album by Van Morrison containing every track that Morrison recorded for Bang Records in the 1960s. It was released on April 28, 2017 by Legacy Recordings on the Bang label.

The first disc, The Original Masters, contains 17 tracks including every track from Morrison's debut album Blowin' Your Mind!. The second disc, Bang Sessions & Rarities, contains alternate takes from the Bang sessions. The third disc, Contractual Obligation Session, contains demos Morrison recorded to fulfill his contractual obligations to Bang; he recorded them in one session on an out-of-tune guitar, with lyrics about subjects including ringworm and sandwiches. The throwaway compositions came to be known as the "revenge" songs, and remained officially unreleased until this collection was compiled.

Track listing

Disc 1: The Original Masters
 Brown Eyed Girl [original stereo mix]
 He Ain't Give You None [original stereo mix]
 T.B. Sheets [original stereo mix]
 Spanish Rose [original stereo mix]
 Goodbye Baby (Baby Goodbye) [original stereo mix]
 Ro Ro Rosey [original stereo mix]
 Who Drove the Red Sports Car [original stereo mix]
 Midnight Special [original stereo mix]
 It's All Right [original stereo mix]
 Send Your Mind [original stereo mix]
 The Smile You Smile [original stereo mix]
 The Back Room [original stereo mix]
 Joe Harper Saturday Morning [original stereo mix]
 Beside You [original mono mix]
 Madame George [original mono mix]
 Chick-a-Boom [original mono mix]
 The Smile You Smile [demo]

Disc 2: Bang Sessions & Rarities 
 Brown Eyed Girl [original edited mono single mix]
 Ro Ro Rosey [original mono single mix with backing vocals]
 T.B. Sheets [Take 2]*
 Goodbye Baby (Baby Goodbye) [Takes 10 & 11]*
 Send Your Mind [Take 3]*
 Midnight Special [Take 7]
 He Ain't Give You None (Take 4)
 Ro Ro Rosey [Take 2]*
 Who Drove The Red Sports Car (Take 6)
 Beside You [Take 2]*
 Joe Harper Saturday Morning [Take 2]*
 Beside You [Take 5]*
 Spanish Rose [Take 14] (4:23)*
 Brown Eyed Girl [Takes 1-6]*
 Brown Eyed Girl [Takes 7-11]*

Note
(*)--Previously unreleased

Disc three: Contractual Obligation Session 
All tracks previously unreleased.

 Twist and Shake
 Shake and Roll
 Stomp and Scream
 Scream and Holler
 Jump and Thump
 Drivin' Wheel
 Just Ball
 Shake It Mable
 Hold on George
 The Big Royalty Check
 Ring Worm
 Savoy Hollywood
 Freaky If You Got This Far
 Up Your Mind
 Thirty Two
 All the Bits
 You Say France and I Whistle
 Blowin' Your Nose
 Nose in Your Blow
 La Mambo
 Go for Yourself
 Want a Danish
 Here Comes Dumb George
 Chickee Coo
 Do It
 Hang on Groovy
 Goodbye George
 Dum Dum George
 Walk and Talk
 The Wobble
 Wobble and Ball

References

Van Morrison compilation albums
2017 compilation albums
Bang Records compilation albums